The 1961 Akron Zips football team represented Akron University in the 1961 NCAA College Division football season as a member of the Ohio Athletic Conference. Led by first-year head coach Gordon K. Larson, the Zips played their home games at the Rubber Bowl in Akron, Ohio. They finished the season with a record of 6–2 overall and 6–1 in OAC play. They outscored their opponents 185–57.

Schedule

References

Akron
Akron Zips football seasons
Akron Zips football